The Lol State was a state of South Sudan with the capital in Raga, that existed between 2 October 2015 and 22 February 2020. It was located in the Bahr el Ghazal region, which is in the northwest section of the country. Lol state bordered Haut-Mbomou and Haute-Kotto in the Central African Republic to the west, South Darfur and East Darfur in Sudan to the north, the disputed region of Kafia Kingi to the northwest, Aweil East State to the northeast, Aweil State to the east, Gbudwe State to the south, and Wau State to the southeast. The state was created alongside 27 other states after a decree issuing the creation of 28 states took place. It was dissolved at the conclusion of the South Sudanese Civil War.

History
On 2 October 2015, President Salva Kiir issued a decree establishing 28 states in place of the 10 constitutionally established states. The decree established the new states largely along ethnic lines. A number of opposition parties and civil society groups challenged the constitutionality of the decree. Kiir later resolved to take it to parliament for approval as a constitutional amendment. In November the South Sudanese parliament empowered President Kiir to create new states. As a result, Lol State was formed from the counties of Raga County in Western Bahr el Ghazal and Aweil North County and Aweil West County in Northern Bahr el Ghazal, encompassing a region consisting of the majority of the Lol River and its western tributaries. 

Rezik Zechariah Hassan was appointed as Governor on 24 December 2015.

On 22 February 2020, President Salva Kiir reverted the 28 states back original ten states at the conclusion of the South Sudanese Civil War. Lol State has since been reincorporated back into Western Bahr el Ghazal and Northern Bahr el Ghazal.

Geography

Administrative counties
After the split up, Lol State broke down even further for a total of 11 counties. Three new additional counties were created later on 6 October 2016 to bring the total of 14. The 14 counties are part of the 180 counties in South Sudan. The 14 counties are consisted of the following:

 Former Raga (Raja) County:
 Eri; headquarters: Ere
 Kuru; headquarters: Uyu-Kuku
 Ringi; headquarters: Boro
 Former Aweil North County:
 Korok East; headquarters: Maper Dut Thou
 Korok West; headquarters: Jach
 Malual Centre; headquarters: Maper Dut Wieu
 Malual North; headquarters: Gok Machar
 Ariath; headquarters: Ariath
 Korok Centre; headquarters: Mayen Ulem
 Former Aweil West County:
 Gomjuer East; headquarters: Wedwil
 Gomjuer West; headquarters: Nyamlel
 Majakbai; headquarters: Majakbai
 Marialbai; headquarters: Marialbai
 Gomjuer Centre; headquarters: unknown

Towns and cities
The capital and largest city of the state of Lol was Raga. Other towns in Lol State included Gossinga and Deim Zubeir.

References

Bahr el Ghazal
States of South Sudan
States and territories established in 2015
States and territories disestablished in 2020
2015 establishments in South Sudan
2020 disestablishments in South Sudan